This is a list of airlines which have an air operator's certificate issued by the Department for Aviation of Belarus.

Scheduled airlines
{|  class="wikitable sortable" style="border: 0; cellpadding: 2; cellspacing: 3;"
|- valign="middle"
! Airline
! IATA
! ICAO
! Image
! Callsign
! Hub airport(s)
! class="unsortable"|Notes
|-
|Belavia
|B2
|BRU
|
|BELAVIA
|Minsk National Airport
|flag carrier
|}

Charter airlines
{|  class="wikitable sortable" style="border: 0; cellpadding: 2; cellspacing: 3;"
|- valign="middle"
! Airline
! IATA
! ICAO
! Image
! Callsign
! Hub airport(s)
! class="unsortable"|Notes
|-
|Grodno Aviakompania
|
|GRX
|
|GRODNO
|Hrodna Airport
|
|-
|Rada Airlines
|
|RDA
|
|
|
|
|}

Cargo airlines
{|  class="wikitable sortable" style="border: 0; cellpadding: 2; cellspacing: 3;"
|- valign="middle"
! Airline
! IATA
! ICAO
! Image
! Callsign
! Hub airport(s)
! class="unsortable"|Notes
|-
|Genex
|
|GNX
|
|AEROGENEX
|Minsk National Airport
|
|-
|Ruby Star
|
|RSB
|
|RUBYSTAR
|Minsk National Airport
|
|-
|TransAVIAexport Airlines
|AL
|TXC
|
|TRANSEXPORT
|Minsk National Airport
|
|-
|Rada Airlines
|
|RDA
|
|
|Minsk National Airport
|
|}

 See also 
List of defunct airlines of Belarus
List of airlines
List of defunct airlines of Europe

References

 
Airlines
Belarus
Airlines
Belarus